Georgia Today is an English language newspaper published in Georgia. The paper is published twice a week in two different versions - Georgia Today and Georgia Today Business.

History and profile
Georgia Today was launched in 2000. The paper, headquartered in Tbilisi, is distributed both nationally and internationally.

In November 2015 the newspaper underwent a re-branding. With the consultation and major design input of awarding winning (European Newspaper of the Year 2015) newspaper designer Kevin Loftus, the layout of Georgia Today was redesigned and a new logo was created. Thereafter, it is published twice a week in two different versions - Georgia Today, with articles on politics, society and culture, and GT Business which focuses on business, economy and law. As of 29 December 2015, Georgian Journal was merged with Georgia Today.

Georgia Today Education
On 26 February 2016 Georgia Today Group announced the release of another version of GT - Georgia Today Education. The paper is issued monthly and is mostly focused on education, technology, innovative business, international events and language learning. The main target audience of Georgia Today Education are teenagers and university students.

See also
List of newspapers in Georgia

References

External links
 Official website

2000 establishments in Georgia (country)
Business newspapers
English-language newspapers published in Europe
Mass media in Tbilisi
Newspapers published in Georgia (country)
Newspapers established in 2000